San Marino is set to participate in the Eurovision Song Contest 2023 in Liverpool, United Kingdom, with "Like an Animal" performed by Piqued Jacks. The Sammarinese broadcaster San Marino RTV (SMRTV) organised the national final  in order to select the Sammarinese entry for the 2023 contest. The event consisted of over 1000 emerging and 32 established artists competing over a five-month period from October 2022 through February 2023 for the opportunity to represent the nation at the contest.

Background 

The nation's debut entry in the 2008 contest, "" performed by Miodio, failed to qualify for the final and placed last in the semi-final it competed in. Following four consecutive non-qualifying years, San Marino qualified for the final for its second time in the Eurovision Song Contest 2019, where Serhat represented the nation for his second time and finished in 19th place with "Say Na Na Na". Her 2021 song, "", which she performed alongside American rapper Flo Rida, qualified for the final, eventually placing 22nd out of the 26 entries. Its selected entrant Achille Lauro and the song "Stripper" failed to qualify for the final, though the broadcaster confirmed the return of the selection event for the 2023 contest.

Before Eurovision

In February 2022, it was announced that  would return for a second edition, while on 13 May 2022, SMRTV confirmed that they would once again use it to select the nation's entry. This marked the third time that the nation had opted to select their entry with a national final format, the first time being in 2018 with 1in360.

Interested artists could apply to partake in the event through the official  website. There were no restrictions on the nationality of the performer nor the language of the song, though all artists and songs had to comply with the rules of the Eurovision Song Contest as set by the European Broadcasting Union (EBU). Artists who proceeded to the next round attended an academy in the Teatro Titano in the City of San Marino from 28 October 2022 and 16 February 2023, acting as preliminary castings. From 20 to 24 February 2022, a series of semi-finals will decide the 22 acts that will move on to the final. Established artists were directly invited to the semi-final stage by Media Evolution SRL. SMRTV received over 1000 applications from 31 different countries.

Emerging acts auditions 
A submission period was opened by SMRTV on 20 August 2022 for emerging artists and composers to submit their entries. By 14 October 2022, the broadcaster announced it had received over 400 applications, particularly from Spain, Germany and Norway, but also from other European countries, Canada, the United States and Australia. Near the close of the submission period, SMRTV reported that they had received over 1,000 applications overall, out of which 299 were selected to take part in the emerging acts round. The emerging acts auditions took place during scheduled dates between 28 October 2022 and 27 January 2023. A special show focused on Una voce per San Marino was aired on 24 January 2023. 

Two acts, Kida and Simone De Biagi, were granted a direct pass to the final, as the only Sammarinese acts in the selection. The 104 international emerging acts, including both auditionees and established artists who got automatic passes to participate in the semi-finals following their auditions, and their country of origin were as follows:
 Emerging artists

 Acousticouple (Italy)
 Alabaster (Italy)
 Andry (Italy)
 Angel Dell (Finland)
 Aria (Italy)
 Aristea (Italy)
 Atwood (Italy)
 Blonde Brothers (Italy)
 Brandon Parasole (Spain)
 Camilla (Italy)
 Christina (Italy)
 Christopher (Germany)
 Con Amore (United Kingdom)
 Daniel Schuhmacher (Germany)
 Daudia (Italy)
 DƏVA (Italy)
 Dionysian (Italy)
 E.E.F. (Italy)
 Edoardo Brogi (Italy)
 Eleonora Alì (Italy)
 Ellynora (Italy)
 Erna Hrönn (Iceland)
 Florin Răduță (Belgium)
 Francesca Monte and Kevan (Italy)
 Francesco Balasso (Italy)
 Francesco Da Vinci (Italy)
 FreakyBea (Italy)
 Gelida (Italy)
 Gisele Abramoff (Germany)
 Ice Eye (Finland)
 Ilenya (Italy)
 Iole (Italy)
 Jenny & Me (Switzerland)
 Jenny May (Latvia)
 Kiara D.V. feat. Pamela Ivonne Cole (United Kingdom)
 Leonor (Italy)
 Lodia (Italy)
 Lola (Croatia)
 Lost City feat Emerique (Italy)
 Luca Minnelli (Italy)
 Luciano Carlino (Italy)
 Luna Palumbo (Italy)
 Morgana (Italy)
 Nevruz (Italy)
 Nicole Hammett (Malta)
 Noe (Italy)
 Norah (Italy)
 Only Sara (Italy)
 Ophelio (Italy)
 Out Offline (Italy)
 Piqued Jacks (Italy)
 Pjero (Italy)
 Raim (Italy)
 Ruggero Ricci (Italy)
 Santo (Italy)
 Sara (Italy)
 Silver (Italy)
 Sophia (Italy)
 Surama Tsu (Italy)
 TES – Tutti Esageratamente Stronzi (Italy)
 Tothem (Italy)
 Veronica Howle (Italy)
 Verónica Romero (Spain)
 Vian (Italy)
 Victor Arbelo (Spain)
 Vina Rose (United Kingdom)
 Viviana (Italy)
 Viviana Milioti (Germany)
 Xada (Italy)
 XGiove (Italy)

 Established artists

 Alessandro Coli (Italy)
 Alfie Arcuri (Australia)
 Camille Cabaltera (Italy)
 Ciro De Luca (Romania)
 Deborah Iurato (Italy)
 Deshedus (Italy)
 DramaLove (United Kingdom)
 Eiffel 65 (Italy)
 Ferrán Faba (Spain)
 Flexx (Italy)
 Francesco Monte (Italy)
 Ginny Vee (Italy)
 Kurt Cassar (Malta)
 Laïoung feat. Marzio (Italy)
 Le Deva (Italy)
 Lorenzo Licitra (Italy)
 Manuel Aspidi (Italy)
 Massimo Di Cataldo and Andrea Agresti (Italy)
 Mate (Italy)
 Matilde (Italy)
 Mayu (Switzerland)
 MeriCler (Italy)
 Moreno (Italy)
 Neja and Luca Guadagnini Band (Italy)
 Rawstrings (Italy)
 Ronela (Albania)
 Rouges (Italy)
 Roy Paci (Italy)
 Selina Albright (United States)
 Sofia Mae (Italy)
 Stefano d'Orazio (Italy)
 Thomas (Italy)

Semi-finals 
On 20 February 2023, SMRTV announced the names of the 106 acts that had been selected to progress to the semi-final stage. In each semi-final, four artists advance immediately to the final. Further four artists in each semi-final are chosen to advance to the second chance round. In total, 22 acts compete in the final: 16 artists chosen from the semi-finals, 4 from the second chance round, and 2 Sammarinese artists that automatically advanced to the final. All of these events will take place at the Teatro Nuovo in Dogana.

Key:
 Finalist
 Second Chance
 Absent

Second Chance 
Before the Second Chance round, Pjero was initially confirmed among the contestants with the song "Spiderman", but he was later disqualified from the competition as his song had already been released two years earlier on digital platforms, in conflict with the contest rules. Selina Albright was initially selected as an alternate, but had to drop out due to logistical reasons; thus, TES - Tutti Esageratamente Stronzi were subsequently selected to compete.

Final 
Key:  Winner  Second place  Third place

At Eurovision 
According to Eurovision rules, all nations with the exceptions of the host country and the "Big Five" (France, Germany, Italy, Spain and the United Kingdom) are required to qualify from one of two semi-finals in order to compete for the final; the top ten countries from each semi-final progress to the final. The European Broadcasting Union (EBU) split up the competing countries into five different pots based on voting patterns from previous contests, with countries with favourable voting histories put into the same pot. On 31 January 2023, an allocation draw was held which placed each country into one of the two semi-finals, and determined which half of the show they would perform in. San Marino was placed into the second semi-final, which will be held on 11 May 2023, and has been scheduled to perform in the second half of the show.

References

External links
 

2023
Countries in the Eurovision Song Contest 2023
Eurovision